ads.txt (Authorized Digital Sellers) is an initiative from IAB Technology Laboratory. It specifies a text file that companies can host on their web servers, listing the other companies authorized to sell their products or services. This is designed to allow online buyers to check the validity of the sellers from whom they buy, for the purposes of internet fraud prevention.

State of adoption
By November 2017, more than 44% of publishers had ads.txt files. More than 90,000 sites were using ads.txt, up from 3,500 in September 2017, according to Pixalate. Among the top 1,000 sites that sold programmatic ads, 57 percent had ads.txt files, compared to 16 percent in September, per Pixalate.

Latest adoption data per FirstImpression.io's Ads.txt Industry Dashboard:

Google has been an active proponent of ads.txt and pushing for faster, widespread adoption by publishers. From the end of October 2017 Google Display & Video 360 only buys inventory from sources identified as authorized sellers in a publisher’s ads.txt file, when a file is available. ads.txt may become a requirement for Display & Video 360.

File format
The IAB's ads.txt specification dictates the formatting of ads.txt files, which can contain three types of record; data records, variables and comments. An ads.txt file can include any number of records, each placed on their own line.

Since the ads.txt file format must be adhered to, a range of validation, management and collaboration tools have become available to help ensure ads.txt files are created correctly.

Latest specification v1.0.2 recommends using a placeholder record to indicate the intent of an empty ads.txt file:

See also 
 Online advertising
 robots.txt
 security.txt

References

External links
 

Online advertising
Internet fraud
Data analysis